Kellys, is a sub locality of  Kilpauk, and it is an important road junction in Central Chennai. Its too distinct to be addressed as a part of Kilpauk by the locals and hence they simply refer to the area as Kellys. It is proposed to implement phase II of Metro railway projects from Madhavaram to SIPCOT in Siruseri, which is corridor number 3. The route includes the areas of Madhavaram Milk Colony, Thapal petti, Murari Hospital, Moolakadai, Sembiyam, Perambur Market, Perambur Metro, Ayanavaram, Otteri, Pattalam, Perambur Barracks Road, Doveton Junction, Purasawakkam High Road and Kellys. From Kellys to Siruseri via. Chetpet, the route continues. In this corridor, comes Kellys, through which tunnelling works are to be carried out. For this, Tunnel Boring Machines from China, are to be used. The Metro railway projects are undertaken by L & T limited and to be completed by 52 months.

Neighborhoods

 Purasawalkam
 Kilpauk
 Ayanavaram
 Egmore
 Puratchi Thalaivar Dr.M.G.Ramachandran Central railway station
 Chennai Egmore railway station
 Periamet
 Doveton
 Otteri
 Chetput.

Roads
Purasawalkam High road
Balfour Road
Medavakkam Tank road
BSNL office road

Surroundings

References

Neighbourhoods in Chennai